Giovanni Bolla (1650 - September 15, 1735) was an Italian painter, active in the Duchy of Parma.

He was born and died in Parma, and seem to have developed a style from Carlo Cignani. Among his works are an Assumption in San Pietro, a San Carlo for the oratory of San Cristoforo, and frescoes in the Palazzo Arcivescovile of Parma.

References

1650 births
1735 deaths
17th-century Italian painters
Italian male painters
18th-century Italian painters
Painters from Parma
18th-century Italian male artists